Chukwuemeka "Emeka" Benjamin Onyemaechi (born 28 July 1974), is a Nigerian Commonwealth medallist judoka.

Achievements

References

1974 births
Living people
Nigerian male judoka
Judoka at the 2004 Summer Olympics
Olympic judoka of Nigeria
Commonwealth Games bronze medallists for Nigeria
Judoka at the 2002 Commonwealth Games
Commonwealth Games medallists in judo
20th-century Nigerian people
21st-century Nigerian people
Medallists at the 2002 Commonwealth Games